Soraya Diase Coffelt (born August 29, 1958) is a lawyer and former judge of the United States Virgin Islands Superior Court. She was the first woman and first Hispanic from St. Thomas to serve as a judge. 

Coffelt developed the V.I. High School Moot Court Competition in 1994, which is an annual, interscholastic competition for high school seniors, with winners receiving college scholarships.

Early life and education
Soraya Diase Coffelt was born in Saint Thomas, U.S. Virgin Islands, to lower-middle-class parents, who were small business owners. Coffelt earned an undergraduate degree in political science from the University of Texas at Austin, graduating with honors in 1978. She then attended Cornell Law School and graduated in 1981 with a Juris Doctor degree. Coffelt attended the University of Nevada at Reno and the National Judicial College, where she earned a degree of Master of Judicial Studies, with a major in trial judges, in 2001.

Publications
In 2014, she published her first book for children titled It’s Not About You, Mr. Santa Claus- A Love Letter About The True Meaning Of Christmas. In 2015, Coffelt announced that the second and third books in the “It’s Not About You” series would be released. It’s Not About You, Mr. Pumpkin- A Love Letter About the True Meaning of Halloween will tell the story of the true origins of Halloween.  It's Not About You, Mrs. Turkey- A Love Letter About The True Meaning of Thanksgiving will tell the story of the origins of Thanksgiving.

2014 Virgin Islands gubernatorial campaign
Coffelt, an Independent candidate, ran with John Canegata, a registered Republican, as an “Independent” or “no party” team for governor and lieutenant governor in the November, 2014 gubernatorial election. This was the first time in Virgin Islands history that such a dual candidacy team had occurred.  The supervisor of elections had initially disqualified the team, but they filed suit and the Third Circuit Court of Appeals affirmed their candidacy pursuant to Virgin Islands law. The team finished in third place in the general election held on November 4, 2014.

Diase-Coffelt was announced as the territory’s attorney general on December 30, 2014, but resigned the post very shortly thereafter, stating that she would not serve as a "puppet" for Gov. Mapp.

Personal life
Coffelt met her husband Gordon on St. Thomas. Her husband was diagnosed with Parkinson’s disease and died in 2013. They had been married for 29 years.

References

External links
As the Stars of the Sky Homepage
Soraya’s Amazon Author Page
"It's Not About You" Series on Goodreads

United States Virgin Islands judges
1958 births
Living people
People from Saint Thomas, U.S. Virgin Islands
University of Texas at Austin College of Liberal Arts alumni
Cornell University alumni
University of Nevada, Reno alumni